The 1999 Big Ten Conference baseball tournament was held at Bill Davis Stadium on the campus of Ohio State University in Columbus, Ohio, from May 15 through 19. The top four teams from the regular season participated in the double-elimination tournament, the eighteenth annual tournament sponsored by the Big Ten Conference to determine the league champion.  won their sixth tournament championship and earned the Big Ten Conference's automatic bid to the 1999 NCAA Division I baseball tournament.

Format and seeding 
The 1999 tournament was a 4-team double-elimination tournament, with seeds determined by conference regular season winning percentage only.

Tournament

All-Tournament Team 
The following players were named to the All-Tournament Team.

Most Outstanding Player 
Bobby Scales was named Most Outstanding Player. Scales was a second baseman for Michigan.

References 

Tournament
Big Ten baseball tournament
Big Ten Baseball Tournament
Big Ten baseball tournament